The 1985–86 SM-liiga season was the 11th season of the SM-liiga, the top level of ice hockey in Finland. 10 teams participated in the league, and Tappara Tampere won the championship.

Standings

Playoffs

Semifinals
 Tappara - Kärpät 3:0 (8:0, 5:2, 4:3)
 HIFK - TPS 3:2 (5:4, 1:3, 2:5, 3:2, 3:2)

3rd place
 Kärpät - TPS 2:0 (4:3, 7:3)

Final
 Tappara - HIFK 4:1 (7:6, 0:1, 3:2, 6:2, 3:1)

Relegation

External links
 SM-liiga official website

1985–86 in Finnish ice hockey
Fin
Liiga seasons